Laurence Doherty defeated the two-time defending champion William Larned in a rematch of the previous year's Challenge Round, 6–0, 6–3, 10–8 to win the men's singles tennis title at the 1903 U.S. National Championships. Doherty had defeated William Clothier in the All Comers' Final, which was delayed by a day due to rain.

The event was held at the Newport Casino in Newport, R.I., USA. The entry list consisted of 97 players, which was slightly smaller than that of the previous year.

Challenge round

Draw

All Comers' finals

Earlier rounds
Section 1

Section 2

Section 3

Section 4

Section 5

Section 6

Section 7

Section 8

References

Men's Singles
1903